El que busca encuentra is 2017 Mexican romantic comedy film directed by Pedro Pablo Ibarra. The film premiered on 24 February 2017, and is stars Ana Brenda Contreras, and Claudio Lafarga, along to Esmeralda Pimentel, Martín Altomaro, Marianna Burelli, Erik Hayser, and Mía Rubín Legarreta. The film was filmed in Mexico City and in San Cristóbal de las Casas, Chiapas.

Plot 
Marcos (Claudio Lafarga) and Esperanza (Ana Brenda Contreras) are two children who fall in love when they get lost in the Azteca Stadium during a football match. More than 20 years later, the memory of that childhood love is so strong that both will look for ways to get back together.

Cast 
 Ana Brenda Contreras as Esperanza Medina
 Mía Rubín Legarreta as Esperanza (90's)
 Claudio Lafarga as Marcos Aguado
 * Ramiro Cid as Marcos (90's)
 Esmeralda Pimentel as Angélica
 Otto Sirgo as Jesús Medina
 Andrés Montiel as Jesús Medina (90's)
 Damayanti Quintanar as Erika
 Marianna Burelli as Mónica
 Martín Altomaro as Claudio
 Erik Hayser as Jorge Ashby
 Alberto Guerra as Manuel Aguado (90's)
 Natasha Dupeyrón as Bibiana Zamarripa
 Fernando Ciangherotti as Sr. Zamarripa
 Ianis Guerrero as Yosu
 Andrés Palacios as Dr. Fuentes
 Luis Arrieta as Fede
 Jorge Zárate as Vendedor Estadio

References

External links 
 

2017 films
2017 romantic comedy films
Mexican romantic comedy films
2010s Mexican films